The men's handball tournament at the 2018 Mediterranean Games was held from 23 June to 1 July at the Campclar Sports Palace in Tarragona.

Participating teams

 (host)

Group stage
All times are local (UTC+2).

Group A

Group B

Group C

Group D

Playoffs

Bracket

Quarterfinals

5–8th place semifinals

Semifinals

Seventh place game

Fifth place game

Bronze medal game

Final

Final standings

References

External links
2018 Mediterranean Games

Handball at the 2018 Mediterranean Games